The Secret Life of... is a television show on the Food Network originally hosted by Jim O'Connor, then later by George Duran.

The ellipsis in the title refers to the food item or style of food which is featured during the 30 minute program.  Included in the lineup are: cookies, steak, comfort foods, coffee, tailgating and popcorn.  The show combines history segments with recipe segments. The history segments highlight key events in a food's history, usually including where it originated. In the recipe segments, George travels to different parts of America to become an "assistant" in the kitchen of a store or restaurant which specializes in the item featured in the episode.

Actor Jim O'Connor hosted the show for the first several years of its existence.

During the O'Connor era, the show ended with the "Jim O'Connor Road Show" where Jim highlighted locations and festivals which celebrate food in unique ways.

As of April 23, 2007 (April 2 was the date announced in aired promos), George Duran took over hosting duties.

George Duran was formerly the host of Food Network's Ham on the Street, but with his current hosting duties, that show's status is unclear.

The series was developed by Sara Hutchison and Kerry Lambert for Greystone Television. Kerry Lambert was the show runner for 7 of its 8 seasons.

Writers and Directors on the series include Scott Burgin, Phil Brody, Artemis Fannin, and David Case.

External links
Food Network: The Secret Life Of...
Food Network Episode Guide

Food Network original programming
2000s American documentary television series
Food travelogue television series
2002 American television series debuts
2008 American television series endings